The Honeydogs is a band from Saint Paul, Minnesota that opened at First Avenue in 1994.

History
The band's popularity grew after signing with record label Mercury Records, and their major label debut album Seen a Ghost in 1997. The band left Mercury after the executives who signed them left the label as Mercury's parent PolyGram merged with Universal, and signed with Palm Records in May 2000 to release their next album, Here's Luck.

Film
Adam Levy and producer Rick Fuller worked together to make a film version of the album 10,000 Years which is a feature-length music video.

Honors and awards
The Honeydogs were honored with a star on the outside mural of the Minneapolis nightclub First Avenue, recognizing performers that have played sold-out shows or have otherwise demonstrated a major contribution to the culture at the iconic venue. Receiving a star "might be the most prestigious public honor an artist can receive in Minneapolis," according to journalist Steve Marsh.

Members
Adam Levy, singer-songwriter, guitars, piano, keyboards
Noah Levy, drums, percussion, vocals
Trent Norton, bass, vocals
Brian Halverson, guitars, vocals
Jeff Victor, piano, keyboards, organ
Peter J. Sands, piano, keyboards, organ
Matt Darling, trombone
Steve Kung, trumpet
Peter Anderson, drums, percussion
Ryan Plewacki, guitars, vocals
John Fields, producer

Discography
The Honeydogs, 1995 
Everything, I Bet You, 1996 (released 12 March 1996, on October/TRG)
Seen a Ghost, 1997 (released 26 August 1997, on Mercury)
Here's Luck, 2000
Island of Misfits, 2001
10,000 Years, 2003
Amygdala, 2006
Can't Feel the Beating, 2008
Sunshine Committee, 2009
What Comes After, 2012
Love & Cannibalism, 2016
"Everything, I Bet You", 2023 vinyl release (Feeling Minnesota Records)

Other recordings
Minneapolis Does Denver, 'Back Home Again', 'October Records' 'TRO 88303-2' 1995
Pointfolio 1.0 / A Life Music Compilation, 'I Miss You',  'the Point 104.1', '70040', 1999
No Picnic Being Cheese: Songs of SteppingStone Theatre, 'Sun Rises in the East', 2007
Minnesota Beatle Project, Vol. 3, 'Dear Prudence', 'Vega Productions & 89.3 The Current', 2011

References

Indie rock musical groups from Minnesota
Musical groups established in 1994
1994 establishments in Minnesota